Yuriy Vitaliyovych Dehteryov (Yuriy Vitalyevich Degteryov; 5 October 1948 – 9 October 2022) was a Ukrainian footballer who played as a goalkeeper.

Dehteryov is considered to be the best goalkeeper and one of the most legendary players to play for Shakhtar Donetsk. He was the first goalkeeper to captain Shakhtar. He held the record for most appearances for Shakhtar and at the time of his death, had the fifth most.

Dehteryov was a member of the football congress of the unrecognised Donetsk People's Republic.

International career
Dehteryov made his debut for Soviet Union on 1 August 1968 in a friendly against Sweden. He played in the 1978 FIFA World Cup and UEFA Euro 1980 qualifiers (USSR did not qualify for the final tournament for either). In his 17 international participations he only allowed 10 goals as well as won 10 of those 17 games. His best games came in October 1977 against France (8 October) and the Netherlands (5 October) where he did not concede a goal in either game.

In 1979, Dehteryov played couple of games for Ukraine at the Spartakiad of the Peoples of the USSR.

Career statistics

Club

Honours
Shakhtar Donetsk
 Soviet Cup: 1980

Soviet Union U19
 UEFA European Under-19 Football Championship: 1966, 1967

Individual
 "Ogoniok" Soviet Goalkeeper of the Year: 1977
 Soviet Footballer of the Year third place: 1977

References

External links
 Profile

1948 births
2022 deaths
People of the Donetsk People's Republic
Ukrainian people of Russian descent
Soviet footballers
Soviet Union international footballers
Ukraine international footballers
Soviet Top League players
FC Shakhtar Donetsk players
Footballers from Donetsk
Pro-Russian people of the 2014 pro-Russian unrest in Ukraine
Pro-Russian people of the war in Donbas
Association football goalkeepers
Ukrainian collaborators with Russia